Madhyamaheshwar or Madmaheshwar is a Hindu temple dedicated to Shiva, located in Gaundar, a village in the Garhwal Himalayas of Uttarakhand, India. The other temples in the circuit include: Kedarnath, Tungnath and Rudranath which are culturally visited before Madhyamaheshwar and, Kalpeshwar generally visited after Madhyamaheshwar. The middle (madhya) or belly part or navel (nabhi) of Shiva is worshipped here. The temple is believed to have been built by the Pandavas, the central figures of the Hindu epic Mahabharata.

Legend

Several folk legends exist surrounding the Garhwal region,  Shiva and the creation of the Panch Kedar temples.

One folklore relates to the Pandavas, the heroes of the Hindu epic Mahabharata. The Pandavas defeated and slayed their cousins — the Kauravas in the epic Kurukshetra war. They wished to atone for the sins of committing fratricide (gotra hatya) and Brāhmanahatya (killing of Brahmins — the priest class) during the war. Thus, they handed over the reins of their kingdom to their kin and left in search of Shiva and to seek his blessings. First, they went to the holy city of Varanasi (Kashi), believed to be Shiva's favourite city and known for its Kashi Vishwanath Temple. But Shiva wanted to avoid them as he was deeply incensed by the death and dishonesty at the Kurukshetra war and therefore, disregarded Pandavas' prayers. He assumed the form of a bull (Nandi) and hid in the Garhwal region.

Not finding Shiva in Varanasi, the Pandavas went to Garhwal Himalayas. Bhima, the second of the five Pandava brothers, then standing astride two mountains started to look for Shiva. He saw a bull grazing near Guptakashi (“hidden Kashi” — the name derived from the hiding act of Shiva). Bhima immediately recognized the deity and caught hold of the bull by its tail and hind legs. But the bull-formed Shiva disappeared into the ground to later reappear in parts, with the hump raising in Kedarnath, the arms appearing in Tungnath, the face showing up at Rudranath, the nabhi (navel) and stomach surfacing in Madhyamaheshwar and the hair appearing in Kalpeshwar. The Pandavas pleased with this reappearance in five different forms, built temples at the five places for venerating and worshipping Shiva. The Pandavas were thus freed from their sins.

A variant of the tale credits Bhima of not only catching the bull, but also stopping it from disappearing. Consequently, the bull was torn asunder into five parts and appeared at five locations in the Kedar Khand of Garhwal region of the Himalayas. After building the Panch Kedar Temples, the Pandavas meditated at Kedarnath for salvation, performed yagna (fire sacrifice) and then through the heavenly path called the Mahapanth (also called Swargarohini), attained heaven or salvation.. The Panch Kedar Temples are constructed in the North-Indian Himalayan Temple architecture with the Kedarnath, Tungnath and Madhyamaheshwar temples looking similar.

After completing the pilgrimage of  Shiva's darshan at the Panch Kedar Temples, it is an unwritten religious rite to visit  Vishnu at the Badrinath Temple, as a final affirmatory proof by the devotee that he has sought blessings of  Shiva.

The temple

The temple in the North-Indian Himalayan style of architecture, is situated in a lush meadow, just below a high ridge. The older, so-called 'Vriddh-Madmaheshwar', temple is a tiny blackened shrine on the ridge, which looks straight up at the Chaukhamba Mountain peaks.
In the current temple, a navel-shaped Shiva-lingam, made of black stone, is enshrined in the sanctum. There are two other smaller shrines, one for Shiva's consort Parvati and the other dedicated to Ardhanarishwara, a half-Shiva half-Parvati image. Bhima, the second Pandava brother is believed to have built this temple and worshipped Shiva here. To the right of the main temple there is a small temple where the image of Saraswati, the Hindu goddess of learning, made of marble is installed in the sanctum.

Worship

The water from the temple precincts is considered so highly sacred that even a few drops are stated to be adequate for ablution. The worship at this temple starts with a specified time period from the beginning of the summer months after the winter and lasts until October/November from start of the winter season when the temple precincts are not accessible due to snow conditions. During the winter period, the symbolic idol of the god is shifted with religious formalities to Ukhimath for continued worship.  Priests at this temple, as in many other temples in the state, are from South India and at this particular temple they are called Jangamas of the Lingayat cast who hail from Mysore in Karnataka state. This induction of priests from outside the state enhances the cultural communications from one part of the country to the other, with language becoming no barrier. It is one of an important sacred pilgrimage centres of Shastrik (textual) importance categorized as Panchasthali (five places) doctrine. This doctrine has been determined on the basis of sectarian association, fairs and festivals, offerings to the deity, sacred declarations made by devotees and specific blessings sought from the god through prayers at different temples. 2 km. away is a small temple called Bura Madhyamaheswar. One has to trek 2 kilometers up the steep ways through large moors and valleys and then would reach in a small lake, where a full Panoramic range of Himalayas consisting of the peaks, Chaukhamba, Kedarnath, Neelkanth, Trishul, Kamet, Panchulli, etc.

Geography

The temple is in a green valley surrounded by snow peaks of Chaukhamba (literal meaning is four pillars or peaks), Neel Kanth and Kedarnath in high Himalayan hill ranges. The Kedar hills, called the Kedar Massif, gives a view of the mountain formation with a number of glaciers which include the source of the Mandakini River. The region has rich flora and fauna, particularly the endangered species of Himalayan monal pheasant and Himalayan musk deer (locally called Kasturi deer) in the Kedarnath Wild Life Sanctuary.

Access

The best time to visit the temple is from April to September. It is advised to visit before the month of October to avoid harsh weather conditions. The trek starts from Gauri Kund, from which there are views of the Himalayan range of hills and the broader Garhwal region, comparable to the Alps.

The trekking is undertaken during two seasons; three months during summer and two months after the monsoon season, as during the rest of the period, except Rudranath, the other four Panch Kedar temples are inaccessible due to snow cover

Madhyamaheshwar Temple is on the Kedarnath road linked by a  road to Kalimath from Guptakashi. Further approach from Guptakashi to the temple is only by a  trek after  by road journey. Guptakashi is on the state highway from Rishikesh via Devprayag, Rudraprayag and Kund. Rishikesh is the entry point to the pilgrim centres of Garhwal Himalayas and is connected by train to the rest of the country. Alternatively, Madhmaheshwar shrine could be reached from Mansoona, Buruwa and Uniyana, via Ukhimath. From Ukhimath, the route passes through Mansoona(7 km), Buruwa(4 km), Ransi (3 km) then Goundar (9 km), Bantoli (2 km) and further 10 km steep climb via Khatra Khal, Maikhumbachatti and kunchatti reach the temple 

The base of the trek is Aktolidhar/Ransi which is 22-24 kilometres away from Ukhimath. From there the trekking way starts. After 6 kilometres is Goundar village a small chatti, with a place to stay where there are 3 lodges to stay. After 2 km lies Bantoli, the point of confluence of Saraswati Ganga and Morkhanda Ganga then it's called Madhyamaheshwar ganga Or Madhu ganga. Then comes Khatara, Nanu, Maikhambachatti, Kunchatti and then comes Madhyamaheswar. The proper trekking distance is 16-18 kilometres from Aktolidhar/Ransi.

Gaundhar and Kalimath are two important places on the route to Madhyamaheshwar. Kalimath in particular, is of importance for the large number of pilgrims who visit the place for spiritual comfort and hence it is called the Sidh Peeth (Spiritual center). Kalimath is famous for the temples to goddesses Mahakali and Mahalakshmi, and Shiva and one of his ferocious forms - Bhairava. The Navaratri time is of special significance at this place when much large devotees visit the place.

References

External links
Panch Kedar, trek map, page 78

Shiva temples in Uttarakhand
Hindu temples in Uttarakhand
Panch Kedar